Lutimaribacter litoralis is a Gram-negative, aerobic, pleomorphic, rod-shaped and non-motile bacterium from the genus of Lutimaribacter which has been isolated from seawater from the coast of the Goto Islands in Japan

References 

Rhodobacteraceae
Bacteria described in 2013